Grzegorz Marek Michalski is an economist, researcher at the School of Management, Computer Science and Finance at Wrocław University of Economics. His main area of research are Business Finance and Financial Liquidity Management. Grzegorz Marek Michalski is a professor of finance. Much of his research is aimed at understanding the determinants and dynamics of financial corporate liquidity. In his research, he has examined the firm value and cost of capital results of corporate liquidity management policies and results of demand for liquidity by firms.  He has also investigated the effects of corporate liquidity on portfolio choice and corporate current assets decisions.  Currently, Grzegorz Marek Michalski is studying the liquidity decisions made by nonprofit organizations. Grzegorz Marek Michalski also studies current business investment in accounts payable, inventories and operating cash. Recent grants and projects examine the effect of liquidity constraints on nonprofit organizations and for-profit small enterprises decisions to level of current assets investments, and on whether or not to use such information on cost of capital level and results on business valuation results. In ongoing work, he studies the unique risk characteristics of business organization capital, and documents the high expected returns which enterprises heavily invested in organization capital earn. Grzegorz Marek Michalski work has been published in ISI academic journals such as the Romanian Journal of Economic Forecasting, the Journal of Economic Computation and Economic Cybernetics Studies and Research, and the Agricultural Economics - Zemědělská ekonomika.

Grzegorz M. Michalski is an author and coauthor of over 80 papers and 10 books.  He is part of Editorial Boards in many international journals: 
 Australasian Accounting Business & Finance Journal (AABFJ)

Works 
Grzegorz M. Michalski writes in three areas:

Value-based working capital management
  
Financial liquidity management
  
  
  
 

Business finance
  
 
 
 
 

Financial analysis 
 ,

References

External links 
 Microsoft Research Profile 
 Thomson Reuters Web of Knowledge listed publications
 Google Scholar listed publications

1972 births
Living people
People from Brzeg
Corporate finance theorists
Polish economists
Wrocław University of Economics alumni